Jafarabad (also Romanized as Ja‘farābād) is a village in Shahr Meyan Rural District, in the Central District of Eqlid County, Fars Province, Iran. At the 2006 census, its population was 14, in 5 families.

References 

Populated places in Eqlid County